The Men From W.O.M.B.L.E. is an album by British acid-house band, Alabama 3, released on 29 November 2013 on Hostage Music Ltd. It was recorded at Jamm Studios in Brixton, London.

W.O.M.B.L.E is an acronym, standing for WORLD OF MILITANT BEAT LIBERATING EXECUTIONERS - a commitment to keep terrorizing the music industry with their subversive approach.

Track listing 
 "W.O.M.B.L.E / This Is How We Build It"
 "Home Is Where The Heartache Is"
 "Count Your Blessings (I Lost It All)"
 "How 2 Swing - Part 3"
 "The Presence of the Lord"
 "Sugarman (Can You Lick It?)"
 "Reach Out"
 "I Am a Deterrent (2Nite 2Nite)"
 "When The Whistle Blows"
 "Following Rainbows"
 "Rise Like Lions"
 "Sick and Perverted (Converted)"

Notes 
The album references children's TV series The Wombles and its theme tune about ‘Underground, overground, wombling free'. Rob Spagg a.k.a. Larry Love, vocals said 'something that you have to establish as a musician, is whether you are underground or overground. I think that Alabama 3 can hold their heads up and say that we have maintained and are developing an underground base, which I'm very proud of.'

It might also be a wink at the London based Anarchist Group WOMBLES who were running underground music events during this period.

See also
Alabama 3 discography

References

External links 
Alabama 3 official website
Interview in The Seventh Hex
Hostage Music Ltd
Jamm Studios

2013 albums
Alabama 3 albums